The Cajun Bowl was a one-time postseason college football bowl game held in 1947 in Lake Charles, Louisiana. The game featured McNeese State and Magnolia A&M (now known as Southern Arkansas). Magnolia A&M entered the game after posting a season record of 9–2. The final result was a scoreless tie.

Results

References

Defunct college football bowls
College football bowls in Louisiana
McNeese Cowboys football bowl games
Sports in Lake Charles, Louisiana
1947 in sports in Louisiana
Southern Arkansas Muleriders football